The variable damselfly or variable bluet (Coenagrion pulchellum) is a European damselfly. Despite its name, it is not the only blue damselfly prone to variable patterning.

Its behaviour is much like that of the azure damselfly; it usually stays close to vegetation. Immatures are often found in adjacent meadows or uncut grassy areas.

Description

The male variable damselfly has a distinctive "wine glass" marking on the second segment of the abdomen. This is a black U-shaped mark with a black line joining the segment's narrow terminal black band. (This distinguishes it from the Azure Damselfly which has the U-shape but no line connecting it to the terminal band.)
Male forms

Female forms

Distribution
The variable damselfly occurs throughout Europe. Scattered and uncommon in mainland Britain but widespread and common in Ireland.

References

External links

http://www.brocross.com/dfly/species/pulch.htm

Damselflies of Europe
Coenagrionidae
Insects described in 1825